Great Coharie Creek is a  long 5th order tributary to the Black River in Sampson County, North Carolina.

Variant names
According to the Geographic Names Information System, it has also been known historically as:  
Cohary Swamp

Course
Great Coharie Creek rises on the Sevenmile Creek divide in northern Sampson County and then flows south to form the Black River with Six Runs Creek (Six Run Creek) about 3 miles southeast of Ingold.

Watershed
Great Coharie Creek drains  of area, receives about 49.0 in/year of precipitation, has a topographic wetness index of 571.73 and is about 14% forested.

See also
List of North Carolina rivers

References

Rivers of North Carolina
Rivers of Sampson County, North Carolina